The second season of Argentine television series Bia was produced by Non Stop Producciones and Pegsa Group, and directed by Jorge Bechara and Daniel De Filippo, the season was first announced in October 2019. It premiered in Disney Channel Latin America on 16 March 2020 and ended on 24 July 2020, once again consisting of 60 episodes. Unlike the first season, the second season is not divided in parts, although the mid-season break remained intact, with 40 episodes airing until May 8, 2020. With its original air date pushed back, the season's remaining episodes started airing in Spain on June 22, 2020, before airing in Latin America the following week. 

The second season was made available on Disney + on December 17, 2020.


Episodes

Notes

References 

Argentine television seasons